Black Star Coal Camp is an unincorporated community and coal town in Harlan County, Kentucky, United States.

Kentucky state legislator Rick Nelson was born here.

References

Unincorporated communities in Harlan County, Kentucky
Unincorporated communities in Kentucky
Coal towns in Kentucky